Anisophyllea beccariana is a tree of tropical Asia in the family Anisophylleaceae. It is named for the Italian botanist Odoardo Beccari.

Description
Its bark is flaky or scaly.

Distribution and habitat
Anisophyllea beccariana grows naturally in Sumatra and Borneo. Its habitat is mixed dipterocarp and kerangas forests from sea-level to about  altitude.

References

beccariana
Trees of Sumatra
Trees of Borneo
Flora of the Borneo lowland rain forests
Flora of the Sundaland heath forests
Plants described in 1875
Taxa named by Henri Ernest Baillon
Taxonomy articles created by Polbot